Bob Bryan and Mike Bryan were the defending champions.  They successfully defended their title, defeating Paul Hanley and Kevin Ullyett 6–3, 5–7, [10–3] in the final.

Seeds

Draw

Draw

External links
Draw

2006 ATP Tour